Puerto Rico Highway 143 (PR-143) is a secondary highway that connects the town of Adjuntas to the town of Barranquitas.

Route description
Heading east from Adjuntas, PR-143 runs through the northern border of the municipality of Ponce, before reaching Orocovis and then Barranquitas.

Tourist attractions
The road is a major part of Puerto Rico's Panoramic Route, being the major middle component of such route. It crosses Toro Negro State Forest, and leads to such landmarks as Cerro de Punta and Lago El Guineo lake. The Orocovis-Villalba lookout and Cerro Maravilla as well as a number of local restaurants can be found along the way.

Route features

Major intersections

See also

 List of highways in Ponce, Puerto Rico
 List of highways numbered 143

References

External links

 Guía de Carreteras Principales, Expresos y Autopistas 

143